The 1991 Big South Conference baseball tournament  was the postseason baseball tournament for the Big South Conference, held from May 11 through 16 at Charles Watson Stadium home field of Coastal Carolina in Conway, South Carolina.  All eight teams participated in the double-elimination tournament. The champion, won the title for the second time and received an automatic bid to the 1991 NCAA Division I baseball tournament.

Format
All eight teams qualified for the tournament.  The teams played a double-elimination bracket.

Bracket and results

Game results

All-Tournament Team

Most Valuable Player
Buddy Cribb was named Tournament Most Valuable Player.  Cribb was a first baseman for Coastal Carolina.

References

Tournament
Big South Conference Baseball Tournament
Big South baseball tournament
Big South Conference baseball tournament